Rombha Nallavan Da Nee is a 2015 Indian Tamil language comedy thriller film written and directed by A. Venkatesh. The film stars Mirchi Senthil and Shruty Bala, while Sarvajeeth plays a pivotal role. The film, produced by actors Sarvajeeth and Deepak Nair released on 6 March 2015.

Cast 

 Mirchi Senthil as Bhaskar
 Shruty Bala
 Sarvajeeth
 A. Venkatesh
 Rekha
 Robo Shankar
 Imman Annachi
 Vennira Aadai Moorthy
 Swaminathan
 John Vijay
 Kanal Kannan
 Sona Heiden
 Rema
 Deepak Nair
 Gaana Bala in a cameo appearance

Production 
The film is produced by Sarvajeeth and Deepak Nair, who also appear in pivotal roles in the film. Director Venkatesh revealed he cast actor Mirchi Senthil in the lead role as he reminded him of actor K. Bhagyaraj, "who had a naïve face, yet everything he did was clever". The film began production in January 2014 and Venkatesh worked on the film alongside his commitments in Sandamarutham.

Soundtrack
The soundtrack is composed by newcomer Ram Surender.
"Friend Nambuda" - Gaana Bala
"God God" - Gaana Bala
"Rajini Enakku" - Franco, Delsy Ninan
"Romba Nallavan" - Deepesh Krishnamurthy
"Ulagame Thozha" - Jeetu Ramachandra

Reception 
Malini Mannath of The New Indian Express wrote that "With a lot of fun moments in the first half, the narration takes a suspense-thriller mode in the second. It’s a well-crafted finale wrapped up with a smart ending".

References

External links
 
 Official website

2010s Tamil-language films
2015 films
Films directed by A. Venkatesh (director)